OKra Records was a Columbus, Ohio-based independent record label established in the late 1980s. It was founded by Dan Dow, the former guitarist for the Gibson Bros. and the former owner of Used Kids Records, which he “co-founded” with Ron House (of Thomas Jefferson Slave Apartments and Great Plains) in 1986. According to Cordelia's Dad drummer Peter Irvine, OKra was run almost entirely by Dow himself. The label stopped putting out records in 1993.

Artists
Ass Ponys
Cordelia's Dad
The Fellow Travellers
Hank McCoy & the Dead Ringers
High Sheriff Ricky Barnes & The Hoot Owls
The Schramms
The Wolverton Brothers

References

Record labels based in Ohio
1980s establishments in Ohio
1993 disestablishments in Ohio
American independent record labels
Companies based in the Columbus, Ohio metropolitan area